The 2014 Goody's Headache Relief Shot 500 was a NASCAR Sprint Cup Series stock car race held on October 26, 2014, at Martinsville Speedway in Ridgeway, Virginia. Contested over 500 laps on the .526-mile (.847 km) short track, it was the 33rd race of the 2014 Sprint Cup Series season, as well as the seventh race of ten in the Chase for the Sprint Cup. Dale Earnhardt Jr. won the race, his fourth win of the season. Jeff Gordon finished second, while Ryan Newman, Tony Stewart, and Joey Logano rounded out the Top 5. The top rookies in the race were Austin Dillon (12th), Justin Allgaier (17th), and Cole Whitt (18th).

Previous week's race
Brad Keselowski held off hard charging Ryan Newman and Matt Kenseth to win the GEICO 500. “I can’t believe it,” Keselowski said. “Talladega is such a wild card and to be able to win here you have to catch breaks and make your own breaks, a little of both. I can’t believe we won at Talladega. This race is the scariest of the three in the bracket. To be able to win here is really a privilege, it really is.” Kyle Busch, Dale Earnhardt Jr., Kasey Kahne and Jimmie Johnson were the four drivers who were eliminated. "We had a real good car most of the day," Earnhardt said. "Got real loose, kind of shuffled out. ... It's just hard racing. That's the way it goes at the end of these races. We weren't in good position."

Report

Background
Martinsville Speedway is an International Speedway Corporation-owned NASCAR stock car racing track located in Henry County, in Ridgeway, Virginia, just to the south of Martinsville. At 0.526 miles (0.847 km) in length, it is the shortest track in the NASCAR Sprint Cup Series. The track was also one of the first paved oval tracks in NASCAR, being built in 1947 by H. Clay Earles. It is also the only race track that has been on the NASCAR circuit from its beginning in 1948.

Practice and qualifying
Justin Allgaier spun his car in the opening minutes of practice. Jamie McMurray lightly brushed the wall, but the damage was cosmetic. Keith (Rodden, crew chief) and Josh (Sell, Engineer) just did a really good job adjusting on the car. It’s amazing you can go quicker your second time out. For years we came here to these places and ran slower. That was a good lap.” "I thought that first lap would be enough to sneak our way in there and then we could make some adjustments," Gordon said. "But I don't mind starting 13th. It's not a bad place to start; you just want that really good pit stall. So we'll definitely suffer with the pit stall a little bit, but we can still win it from there. Our car's really good." “We just missed it today," Kevin Harvick said. "We were way too loose. … We have to get better and be ready to go on Sunday." Harvick slapped the wall twice during qualifying and qualified 33rd. Justin Allgaier had smoke billowing from his car during the session. The culprit was a loss of power steering.

Race

The race was scheduled to begin at 1:43 PM Eastern time, but it started at 1:48 p.m. with Jamie McMurray leading the field to the green. The first caution flag came out on lap 4 when Alex Bowman hopped the curb in turn 2 and spun around. The race restarted on lap nine and Matt Kenseth took the lead from McMurray for a lap, but gave the lead back to him the next lap. On lap 16, the second caution flag wave when Josh Wise tapped the corner of Travis Kvapil in turn 1 and sent him spinning. The race restarted on lap 21 with McMurray still leading. The third caution occurred on lap 75 when Kyle Fowler spun out in turn 2. The race restarted on lap 82 with McMurray still leading.

On lap 85, Jeff Gordon took the lead from McMurray. On lap 101, Jimmie Johnson was running third when he made an unscheduled stop to repair a loose wheel. He exited pit road in 38th place, and two laps down, but made one lap back by passing Gordon thanks to fresher tires. On lap 123, Gordon moved into second on the all-time laps led list at Martinsville Speedway.

The fourth caution of the race flew on lap 160 after Kasey Kahne tapped Brian Vickers and spun him around in turn 4 in front of the leader. “I was passing him and he ran me into the Turn 2 wall or he was going to, so I lifted. Then he blocked into 3, so I turned to go low and then he comes low and spun himself out,” Kahne said after being released from the infield care center for an unrelated incident on Lap 438. “He definitely wrecked us on purpose the first time, I mean look at the video,” Vickers said. “He just hooked us in the bumper and just wrecked us, I don’t know why.” This would be the first of three incidents where the two cars made contact. The race restarted on lap 169, and McMurray and Gordon traded the lead until McMurray was pinned in the outside line and freight-trained.

Reed Sorenson brought out the fifth caution on lap 189 after spinning out in turn 2. Gordon won the race off pit road, but he and Ryan Newman were flagged for speeding off pit road and had to restart from the tail end of the field. This meant that when the race restarted on lap 206, Dale Earnhardt Jr. was leading. Two laps after the restart, the sixth caution came out when David Ragan got clipped by Alex Bowman and spun in turn 4.

The race restarted on lap 214 and Earnhardt Jr. lost the lead to Joey Logano.

The seventh caution flag flew on lap 221, in what would be the second incident between Vickers and Kahne, when Vickers turned Kahne into the turn 1 wall, presumably as payback for the earlier incident on lap 160. Brad Keselowski was caught in the melee too, but suffered little, if any, damage.

The race restarted on lap 227, but the eighth caution came out a lap later when Matt Kenseth locked up his brakes, got loose and got into Kevin Harvick in turn 1. “The good thing about this format is you have two more weeks and two race tracks that we can win on,” Harvick said. “Everybody was so worried about us starting in the back (because of a poor qualifying effort) and we wrecked at the front.” “He won’t win this championship,’‘ Harvick said of Kenseth. “If we don’t, he won’t.” “I totally understand how he feels,’’ Kenseth said of Harvick. “He knows it’s a mistake, but it doesn’t help him. He got taken out of the race for being in the wrong place at the wrong time.’’

The race restarted on lap 239 with Logano still leading. The ninth caution came out on lap 255 when a plastic Ford grille plate was spotted in turn 1. Justin Allgaier stayed out when the leaders pitted and assumed the lead. The race restarted on lap 261 and Tony Stewart took the lead. He led for fourteen laps before Logano reassumed the lead.

The tenth caution flag flew on lap 277 for the third case of contact between Kahne and Vickers. NASCAR issued a warning to the crew chiefs of both drivers to cease the antics.

The race restarted on lap 283. Denny Hamlin took the lead on lap 291. The eleventh caution flag came out on lap 294 when Martin Truex Jr. clipped Danica Patrick going into turn 2. Earnhardt Jr. stayed out when the leaders pitted and assumed the lead. The race restarted on lap 300. Kurt Busch took the lead on lap 314. He led for 21 laps before Gordon took the lead, after rallying all the way back from his speeding penalty.  On lap 359, Denny Hamlin retook the lead.

The twelfth caution flag came out on lap 387 when Reed Sorenson blew a right-front tire and slammed the wall in turn 1.

The race restarted on lap 394. Debris on the front stretch brought out the 13th caution on lap 418. Clint Bowyer won the race off pit road to take the lead. After pit stops, Kurt Busch's engine blew up while running seventh on the backstretch, prompting an extended yellow flag to allow crews to clean up oil spilled by Busch's car.

The race ultimately restarted with 67 laps to go. Three laps later, the 14th caution came out for a massive crash on the front straightaway. It started when Brad Keselowski lost an axle. As he tried to move out of the way, he got rear-ended by Casey Mears. A group of cars including Kasey Kahne, Martin Truex Jr., Danica Patrick and Carl Edwards was collected. A ten-minute 47 second red flag ensued to allow for cleanup. The race restarted with 58 laps to go.

Dale Earnhardt Jr. took back the lead with 47 laps to go.

Caution flew for the 15th time with twelve laps to go after Kyle Larson made contact with Marcos Ambrose trying to take the spot. The red flag was displayed for the second time of the race. Tony Stewart stayed out when the leaders pitted and assumed the lead.

Dale Earnhardt Jr. took the lead from Stewart with four laps to go and held off a hard charging Jeff Gordon to score his first career win at Martinsville Speedway. “Oh, man, been trying to win here for so many years,” Earnhardt said. “Real emotional win. I can’t believe we won here. We’re going to drink a lot of beer tonight. It’s a real emotional win. This team on pit road was great and Steve (Letarte, crew chief) and the guys did a real good job all day. They gave me a great shot at it there with the call at the end to take tires. I can’t believe we won here. This means so much to all of us. It’s just real emotional.” "That means so much to Hendrick Motorsports," Gordon said. "That's the best way you can possibly pay tribute to those that we lost 10 years ago. To have a 1-2 finish, that's pretty awesome. I would have loved to have gotten that win to move on to Homestead, but this is certainly a great start for us." "I thought we had the car to beat," Gordon said. "Those last couple of laps were just wild. This means so much to Hendrick Motorsports. It's the best way to pay tribute to everyone we lost 10 years ago. I would have loved to get that win to move on to Homestead. But I'm real happy for Dale. I know this means so much to him." "We struggled a little bit with the balance all day long, being really, really tight, like really, really tight," said Ryan Newman. "The guys did a good job of adjusting it. Kept getting it better and better. Still never really got it right. But the strategy of two tires there at the end worked out good for us. Right number of laps with the guys that stayed out, kept the guys behind us that had four tires." "I'm really surprised that we made it to the end without another caution," he continued. "The guys that were out front there with no tires, it was really just a replay. At least had the anticipation of it to be a replay of the race I won when I took tires a few years ago. We were fortunate to make it up from eighth to third there. Had a pretty good restart. Got down to the bottom when I needed to. Those guys were kind of all jumbled up. I got into the back of Clint (Bowyer) a little bit there. I apologize to him. But I had the 22 (Joey Logano) pushing me all the way through the corner. I don't know there was a whole lot I could have done any different. In the end it was a crazy restart at Martinsville, which we all expected."

Results

Qualifying

Race results

Race summary
 24 lead changes among different drivers
 15 cautions for 105 laps, 2 red flags for 19 minutes 38 seconds 
 Time of race: 3:43:07
 Dale Earnhardt Jr. won his fourth race of the 2014 season

Standings after the race
Drivers with highlighted boxes are drivers currently in the Chase at this point.

Drivers' Championship standings

Manufacturers' Championship standings

Note: Only the first sixteen positions are included for the driver standings.

References

Goody's Headache Relief Shot 500
Goody's Headache Relief Shot 500
Goody's Headache Relief Shot 500
NASCAR races at Martinsville Speedway